Diane Crespo is a producer and director of feature films and documentaries. She co-founded Cicala Filmworks in 1997.

Her film credits include Arranged (director/producer), Clutter (director), My Last Day Without You (producer) and Contested Streets (producer).

References

External links

Cicala Filmworks

American film producers
Year of birth missing (living people)
Living people